Astragalus propinquus (syn. Astragalus membranaceus, commonly known as Mongolian milkvetch in English; 'Хунчир'  in Mongolian; huáng qí, běi qí or huáng huā huáng qí, in Mongolia, is a flowering plant in the family Fabaceae. It is one of the 50 fundamental herbs used in traditional Mongolian medicine.  It is a perennial plant and it is not listed as being threatened.

Herbalism 
A. propinquus is used in traditional Chinese medicine (TCM).  A. propinquus is a component in Lectranal, a food supplement used in treatment of seasonal allergic rhinitis, though there is limited evidence of its effectiveness.

Chemistry 
Chemical constituents of the roots (Radix Astragali) include polysaccharides and triterpenoids (such as astragalosides), as well as isoflavones (including kumatakenin, calycosin, and formononetin) and their glycosides and malonates.  An extract of A. propinquus called TA-65 may activate telomerase, extending the lengths of the shortest telomeres which protect the terminal DNA at the ends of all chromosomes. It contains the saponin cycloastragenol.

Toxicology 
While several other species of Astragalus are known to cause severe poisonings in livestock due to indolizine alkaloids, aliphatic nitro compounds, and accumulated selenium, none of these constituents have been detected in Astragalus propinquus used in dietary supplements and TCM preparations.

Compendial status 
A. propinquus is listed in the following official pharmacopoeia:
 Japanese Pharmacopoeia

See also 
 Tremella fuciformis

Notes and references

External links 
 
 

propinquus
Flora of temperate Asia
Forages
Herbs
Plants used in traditional Chinese medicine
Telomeres